Frederick Charles Kenneth Wharton (21 March 1916 – 12 January 1957) was a British racing driver from Smethwick, England. He competed in off-road trials, hillclimbs, and rallying, and also raced sports cars and single-seaters. He began racing in the new National 500cc Formula in his own special, and later acquired a Cooper. His World Championship Grand Prix debut was at the 1952 Swiss event, run to Formula 2 regulations, where he started from 13th position on the grid and finished 4th. He participated in a total of 15 World Championship Grands Prix, from which he scored three championship points.

On 17 August 1935, he was involved in a crash at Donington Park while driving an Austin in an 850 c.c. race. The incident, which saw him overturn at Red-gate corner occurred on lap one of five. Wharton escaped with abrasions to the arm.

In 1951 he "travelled abroad, with Peter Bell's 2-litre E.R.A., to finish 3rd overall in the Susa/Mont Cenis hill-climb and 4th overall in the Aosta/Grand Saint Bernard hill-climb. With a Cooper 500 he also competed in the German Freiburg hill-climb where he was runner-up in the 500 cc class to Stirling Moss." Wharton won the Freiburg event outright in the E.R.A. on 5 August, climbing the 7.4 miles of the Schauinsland Pass, in 8 minutes 5.33 seconds. On 19 August he was fastest at the Vue des Alpes  hill-climb, with a time of 3 minutes 57.8 seconds.  He won the British Hill Climb Championship every year from 1951 to 1954, and remains the only driver to have won four successive BHCC titles. Other successes with ERA R4D included winning the Brighton Speed Trials in 1954, 1955 and 1956.

Success in rallies included winning the Tulip Rally in 1949, 1950 and 1952, driving Fords. He also became British Trials Champion.

On 4 July 1954, he and Peter Whitehead won the Reims 12-hour race in a Jaguar D-Type.

In 1957 Wharton was fatally injured when his Ferrari Monza crashed in a sports car race at the Ardmore Circuit in Auckland, New Zealand. More than 1,100 people attended his funeral, including his mother, father, sister, aunt, uncle and cousins.

Complete World Championship results
(key)

References

External links 
 Ken Wharton profile at The 500 Owners Association

1916 births
1957 deaths
24 Hours of Le Mans drivers
Brighton Speed Trials people
British hillclimb drivers
BRM Formula One drivers
English Formula One drivers
English racing drivers
Racing drivers who died while racing
Sport deaths in New Zealand
Sportspeople from Smethwick
Vanwall Formula One drivers
World Sportscar Championship drivers
12 Hours of Reims drivers